Nathalie Pownall is a British actress. She grew up in Bristol and was a member of the Bristol Old Vic  Youth Theatre before moving to London to train professionally. She has appeared as a guest lead in  BBC series Casualty, Doctors and ITV's Doc Martin with Martin Clunes. In 2008, she played Maia Sturn, the solo role in an online viral series 'Emergency Subnet'  for Channel 4 to promote and launch the American Animated series Afterworld  in the UK.

She also played Timmy in British Horror  Credo  (The Devil's curse USA).

In 2006 she helped set up Tutuma,  a charitable organization led by leading medical professionals and Actors, that ran theatre and dance workshops for orphans in Zimbabwe. The same year Tutuma was commissioned to perform Zimbabwe's first production of Closer by British Playwright Patrick Marber play at HIFA - Harare International Festival of the Arts. She also played Eve in the 2015 film Scrawl.

On 1 December 2022, she appeared in an episode of the BBC soap opera Doctors as Gweneth Lully.

References

External links 
 Nathalie Pownall
 
 Upstart Theatre Company

English television actresses
Actresses from Bristol
Living people
Year of birth missing (living people)